Afzad (also Romanized as Afzād; also known as Abzāt, Afzād, Afzāţ, and Āhzād) is a village in Javar Rural District, in the Central District of Kuhbanan County, Kerman Province, Iran. At the 2006 census, its population was 217, in 69 families.

References 

Populated places in Kuhbanan County